The Great Midwest Athletic Conference (G-MAC) women's basketball tournament is the annual conference women's basketball championship tournament for the Great Midwest Athletic Conference. The tournament has been held annually since 2013. It is a single-elimination tournament and seeding is based on regular season records.

The winner receives the G-MAC's automatic bid to the NCAA Division II women's basketball tournament.

Cedarville and Walsh have won the most tournaments, with two each.

Results

Championship records

 Lake Erie, Northwood, and Ohio Dominican have not yet advanced to the tournament final.
 Alderson Broaddus, Central State, Davis & Elkins, Ohio Valley, Salem International, and UVA Wise never reached the tournament final as G-MAC members.
 Schools highlighted in pink are former G-MAC members.

See also
 Great Midwest Athletic Conference men's basketball tournament

References

NCAA Division II women's basketball conference tournaments
Basketball Tournament, Women's
Recurring sporting events established in 2013